In mathematics, particularly in differential geometry, a Zoll surface, named after Otto Zoll, is a surface homeomorphic to the 2-sphere, equipped with a Riemannian metric all of whose geodesics are closed and of equal length.  While the usual unit-sphere metric on S2 obviously has this property, it also has an infinite-dimensional family of geometrically distinct deformations that are still Zoll surfaces.  In particular, most Zoll surfaces do not have constant curvature.

Zoll, a student of David Hilbert, discovered the first non-trivial examples.

See also 
 Funk transform: The original motivation for studying the Funk transform was to describe Zoll metrics on the sphere.

References

External links 

 Tannery's pear, an example of Zoll surface where all closed geodesics (up to the meridians) are shaped like a curved-figure eight.

Surfaces